The timeline of Edmonton history is a chronology of significant events in the history of Edmonton, Alberta.

Pre-European period
Indigenous peoples roamed Alberta for thousands of years, or even tens of thousands of years. The rim of the river valley and its ravines and hilltops in Edmonton are known to have been well-used as campgrounds and look-out points during this time. Rabbit Hill, today's Mary Lobay Park, Mount Pleasant Cemetery and Huntington Heights (near Whitemud Drive west of Calgary Trail) are known to be sites of human activity for millennia.

18th century
1754 – Anthony Henday, an explorer working for the Hudson's Bay Company (HBC), may have been the first European to enter the Edmonton area.
1795 – Fort Edmonton was established on the north bank of the river near today's Fort Saskatchewan, as a major trading post for the Hudson's Bay Company.

19th century
1812 – Fort Edmonton (Hudson's Bay Company) moved to Rossdale, never again to move out of today's Edmonton.
1830 – Fort Edmonton moved up the hill, to near today's legislative building.
1870 – Fort Edmonton becomes part of Canada and of the North-West Territories
1871 – The first prominent buildings outside the walls of Fort Edmonton, a Methodist church mission building and manse, built by George McDougall and his family.  They added mix to the existing log cabins of gold prospectors and frontier farmers and hunters, Indigenous, European and Métis, who lived in the bush where City of Edmonton sits today.
1876 – Treaty 6 is signed, and title to the Fort Edmonton region is ceded to the Crown.
1879 – Edmonton's first local exhibition.
1880 – Edmonton Bulletin published. Frank Oliver, publisher
1882 – Dominion Land Survey done in Edmonton area. incorporated existing river lots along river and helped firm up local land ownership.
1886 – Edmonton's coldest temperature is recorded as  January 19. 
1891 – Community of South Edmonton (Strathcona) established south of the river upon opening of the Calgary and Edmonton Railway.(Became a town in 1899.)
1892  
Second McDougall Church was built at site of first church.
Edmonton incorporated as a town with a population of 700.
1897 – Edmonton was a starting point for people making the trek overland to the Klondike Gold Rush. Nearby South Edmonton (Strathcona) was the northernmost railway point on the western Prairies.

20th century

1900 – Low Level Bridge completed.
1903
Edmonton Journal founded.
Methodist Church Board founds Alberta College 
 Edmonton, Yukon and Pacific Railway crossed Low Level Bridge to connect Edmonton by rail to Strathcona and thence to the outside world.
1904 – 
 Incorporated as a city in 1904 with a population of 8,350.
 Elected Liberal MP Frank Oliver in 1904 federal election. (Strathcona on the southside elected Liberal MP Peter Talbot.)
1905
Edmonton became the capital of Alberta, as Alberta became a province in Confederation.
Canadian Northern Railway (CNoR) arrived in Edmonton, accelerating growth. This was first transcontinental line to enter Edmonton.
1907-13 –  real estate and construction boom. With amalgamation of Cities of Strathcona and Edmonton, the population of Edmonton grew to 72,500.
1907 – Six miners die in a fire at the Strathcona Coal Company, the worst industrial accident Edmonton has suffered
1908
Edmonton Hockey Club makes the city's first appearance at the Stanley Cup finals.
Strathcona Canadian Pacific Railway Station completed, along the Calgary & Edmonton Railway line.
University of Alberta established and began instruction.
1909 
Grand Trunk Pacific Railway entered Edmonton.
Arlington Apartments completed. (destroyed by fire in 2005) 
1910 – Third McDougall Church completed, dedicated in the honour of George McDougall. 
1911 – Connaught Armoury built.
1912
Edmonton amalgamated with the city of Strathcona, a city since 1907, south of the North Saskatchewan River; as a result, the city extended south of the river.
First Presbyterian Church completed.
1913
Alberta Legislature Building completed.
High Level Bridge opened. It carried a CPR rail-line as well as private vehicles (both horse-drawn and gas-fueled) and pedestrians.
Robertson-Wesley United Church completed.
 Edmonton economy collapses. Land in the Hudson Bay Co reserve was put on the market and sold, with the money raised by the sales going to HBC headquarters out of the province. British investment dried up as Europe invested in military preparation for the coming war. This all helped cause real estate prices to drop. With the start of World War I, the city's population declined, going from 72,000 in 1914 to under 54,000 in only two years, people leaving to eke out existence on farms, or off to war, or to other centres.

1914
 Vote held on street naming system (following amalgamation of Strathcona and Edmonton, each with their own systems) Numerical numbering (centred on Jasper Avenue and 101 Street) got 2099 votes; "Edmonscona" scheme (a mixed number-name system) got 1471 votes.
1915
Fort Edmonton dismantled.
Hotel Macdonald opened.
North Saskatchewan River flood of 1915 leaves 2000 homeless.
1917 – Edmonton annexes village of West Edmonton (Calder).
1918–1919 – Spanish Flu kills 614 Edmontonians.
1920 – Edmonton Symphony Orchestra holds its first performance.
1922
CJCA begins broadcasting as city's first radio station.
Edmonton Grads win the Canadian Basketball Championship. The team wins this competition each year from 1922 to 1940.
 Edmonton Elks football team, owned by local Elks society, scored touchdowns. The team was later named the Edmonton Eskimos (and has now returned to this earlier name).
1923 – Edmonton Grads win the World Basketball Championships.
 1923 Edmonton used single transferable voting for the first time in its municipal elections. The city switched back to block voting in 1928.
1924 – The Edmonton Art Gallery opened for the first time.
1926 - Edmonton elected its first "third-party" MLAs - UFA's John Lymburn and Labour's Lionel Gibbs. Use of proportional representation likely cause.
1929 – Blatchford Field (now Edmonton City Centre (Blatchford Field) Airport) commenced operation.
1930 – Canadian Derby established.
1937 – Edmonton's hottest temperature (until 1998) is recorded as 37.2 °C on June 29.
1938
Al-Rashid Mosque completed.
Clarke Stadium completed.
1947 – The first major oil discovery in Alberta was made near the town of Leduc, south of Edmonton.
1940s and 1950s – The subsequent oil boom gave Edmonton new status as the "Oil Capital of Canada", and during the 1950s, the city increased in population from 149,000 to 269,000. After a relatively calm but still prosperous period in the 1960s, the city's growth took on renewed vigour concomitant with high world oil prices, triggered by the 1973 oil crisis and the 1979 Iranian Revolution. The oil boom of the 1970s and 1980s ended abruptly with the sharp decline in oil prices on the international market and the introduction of the National Energy Program in 1981; that same year, the population had reached 521,000.
1942 – A record-breaking snowfall of 39.9 centimetres hits Edmonton on November 15.
1947 – St. Josaphat Cathedral completed.
1947–1965 – Suburban boom began.
1948 – Edmonton Flyers wins the Allan Cup.
1950 – Edmonton Mercurys win the Ice Hockey World Championships
1951 – Edmonton Bulletin ceases production.
1952
Clover Bar Bridge completed.
Edmonton Mercurys win the Olympic Gold medal.
1953 – Nationwide epidemic, 16 Edmontonians died from poliomyelitis.
1954 – Edmonton Eskimos win their first Grey Cup.
1955
Groat Bridge completed.
Westmount Centre opened as the city's first shopping mall.
1957 – Jubilee Auditorium opened.
1959 – Valley Zoo opened.
1961 – Beverly, Alberta amalgamated with the City of Edmonton.
1962
Edmonton's local exhibition had been renamed to Klondike Days.
Northern Alberta Institute of Technology established.
1963
Edmonton Oil Kings win their first Memorial Cup.
Edmonton Opera established.
1964 – Jasper Place amalgamated with Edmonton.
1965
Citadel Theatre opened.
Edmonton aircraft bombing.
1966 – CN Tower was completed, the tallest building in Edmonton at the time, and city's first skyscraper.
1967 – Provincial Museum and Archives of Alberta opened.
1969 – Edmonton becomes the first Canadian city to join the North American Emergency Telephone 911 plan.
1970s – Major construction boom occurred.
1971
Grant MacEwan Community College established.
James MacDonald Bridge opened.
AGT Tower was completed and the tallest building in Edmonton at the time.
1972
Alberta Oilers founded.
Ukrainian Canadian Archives & Museum Of Alberta opened.
1974
Fort Edmonton Park established.
Northlands Coliseum opened.
1976
Heritage Days Festival begins at Mayfair Park.
Muttart Conservatory opened.
1978
1978 Commonwealth Games.
Edmonton Light Rail Transit started.
Edmonton Sun founded.
Commonwealth Stadium opened.
Kinsmen Centre opened.
1979 – Edmonton Oilers join the National Hockey League.
1980s – Although the National Energy Program was later scrapped by the federal government, the collapse of world oil prices in 1986 and massive government cutbacks kept the city from making a full economic recovery until the late 1990s.
1980
Edmonton Folk Music Festival launched.
The Great Divide waterfall flows from the High Level Bridge for the first time.
1981
Heritage Mall opened
West Edmonton Mall opened.
1982
Edmonton Fringe Theatre Festival is held for the first time.
1983
1983 Summer Universiade.
Hotel Macdonald closes after falling into despair.
Manulife Place was completed and was the tallest building in Edmonton until it was surpassed in 2017 by the Stantec tower.
Edmonton Convention Centre opened.
Phase II of West Edmonton Mall opened.
Fantasyland opened
1984
Edmonton hosts its Grey Cup Game for the first time.
Edmonton Oilers win its first Stanley Cup
Edmonton Trappers win its first Pacific Coast League championship.
Edmonton Space Science Centre opened.
1985
Edmonton International Street Performer's Festival is held for the first time.
Phase III of West Edmonton Mall opened.
1986
Edmonton International Film Festival is held for the first time.
North Saskatchewan River rises to 11.5 metres, the worst flood since 1915.
Three people died and one was injured when the Mindbender roller coaster at West Edmonton Mall's Fantasyland derailed.
The Works Art & Design Festival launched.
1987 – Edmonton tornado.
1991 – Hotel Macdonald reopened after significant restoration and a change in ownership.
1992 – The current Edmonton City Hall completed.
1994 - Edmonton Telephones (Telus), the city's publicly owned telephone company, is privatized after 91 years of service.
1995
Edmonton Queen christened.
Fantasyland changed its name to "Galaxyland", after a lawsuit filed by the Walt Disney Company.
1996 – 1996 World Figure Skating Championships.
1997 – Winspear Centre opened.
1999 - Phase IV of West Edmonton Mall opened.

21st century

2000 - Heritage Mall closed.
2001 – 2001 World Championships in Athletics.
2003 – 2003 Heritage Classic.
2004 – Large hailstorm causing widespread damage throughout the city most notably causing the evacuation of West Edmonton Mall.
2005
Edmonton hosts its first Grand Prix
Edmonton celebrates 100 years of being the capital of Alberta.
2006 – 2006 Women's Rugby World Cup.
2007 – 2007 Ford World Men's Curling Championship.
Largest residential fire in Edmonton's history burns down a 149 unit condominium complex, which was under construction, along with 18 duplexes. Causing $20 million in damages. 
2008 – Edmonton region population surpasses one million becoming the most northern city in North America with a population over one million.
2009 – Edmonton submitted a bid for Expo 2017.
2010 – The Art Gallery of Alberta is reopened in its new building.
2011
The Epcor Tower is completed, becoming Edmonton's tallest skyscraper.
The Edmonton Clinic opened.
The city's homicide rate swells; 47 murders by the year.
2013 – The inaugural Tour of Alberta launches from Edmonton
2014 – 53-year-old Phu Lam murders his ex-wife and six relatives on December 29, the worst mass murder in Edmonton's history.
2016 
Construction was completed on August 16, 2016 for the Royal Alberta Museum new location in Downtown Edmonton.
Rogers Place arena in Downtown opened in September.
Anthony Henday Drive is officially completed with the opening of its northeast section, including two new bridges over the river, on October 1. It is the furthest north ring road in North America.
2017
2017 Edmonton attack
2018
Completion of the Stantec Tower becoming the tallest in building in Canada outside of Toronto.
Construction on the JW Marriott Hotel completed, becoming the second tallest building in Edmonton.
Opening of a new building for the Royal Alberta Museum to the public.

See also
History of Edmonton
List of tallest buildings in Edmonton

References

Timelines of cities in Canada